The Shanghai Challenger is a tennis tournament held in Shanghai, China since 2011. The event is part of the ATP Challenger Tour and is played on outdoor hard courts.

Past finals

Men's singles

Men's doubles

References

 
ATP Challenger Tour
Tennis tournaments in China
Hard court tennis tournaments
Sports competitions in Shanghai